Shannon Lynn McRandle (née Jones, born August 28, 1969 in Killeen, Texas) is a model and makeup artist from Killeen. In 1999, she gained recognition for her portrayal of the Star Wars character Mara Jade in photographs for the Star Wars card games, having been selected for the role by Decipher, Inc.

In addition to her modeling work, McRandle also works as a commercial hair and makeup stylist, providing services for print and video shoots.

Early life
Born Shannon Lynn Jones on August 28, 1969, in Killeen, Texas, US, to Leonard Jones (stationed at Fort Hood, drafted into the army for the Vietnam War) and Barbara Kubiszewski Walsh. She has two younger half-sisters, Hillary and Adrienne, from her step-father (John Meador). She began modeling at the age of three for department store fashion shows in the Richmond, Virginia area.

Education and career
After high school, she moved to Las Vegas for four years, earning her Bachelor of Arts degree in Communication Studies (1993) from the University of Nevada, Las Vegas, with an emphasis on Public Relations and a minor in Sociology.

Since the age of twelve, McRandle's modeling career included photography shoots, runways, and character modeling.  In Las Vegas, she worked as a promotional model at the Las Vegas Convention Center, Bally's Mirage, MGM, and in the Roman Festival at Caesar's Palace. She also worked as a make-up artist in the Hampton Roads and Virginia Beach areas.

Star Wars
Before 1998, the character of Mara Jade appeared only as illustrations created by various artists based on the descriptions provided of her appearance in novels in the Star Wars expanded universe.  A long-time fan of the Star Wars franchise, McRandle auditioned to be cast as an image for Mara Jade after LucasFilm decided to use a photographic likeness as a model for Mara.  At the time the photographs were taken in 1999, she was known as Shannon Baksa from her first marriage in 1994.  LucasFilm Ltd. used McRandle's likeness for merchandise of Mara Jade.  Illustrations of the character were influenced by McRandle's appearance.

Personal life
Shannon Lynn married United States Navy veteran Jamie McRandle on September 18, 2002. They have three children. She and her family live in Virginia Beach, Virginia.

In 2013, Shannon McRandle was diagnosed with Ankylosing Spondylitis and Stage 3 Rectal Cancer. The cancer is in remission, but the radiation and chemo caused severe osteoporosis in her back and hips, and resulted in a severely-weakened immune system as well as several other medical issues. None of the AS treatments were successful.

She has a GoFundMe page to raise funds for treatments.

References

1969 births
Living people
People from Texas
University of Nevada, Las Vegas alumni